A Holly Dolly Christmas is the forty-seventh solo studio album by American singer-songwriter Dolly Parton. It was released on October 2, 2020, by Parton's Butterfly Records in partnership with 12-Tone Music Group. The album was produced by Kent Wells, with Parton serving as executive producer. It is Parton's third Christmas album, following 1984's Once Upon a Christmas with Kenny Rogers and 1990's Home for Christmas. The album features guest appearances by Michael Bublé, Billy Ray Cyrus, Miley Cyrus, Jimmy Fallon, Willie Nelson, and Parton's brother Randy. It peaked at number one on the Billboard Top Country Albums chart, becoming Parton's eighth album to top the chart. The album also peaked at number one on the Billboard Top Holiday Albums chart and number 16 on the Billboard 200. The album was nominated for Best Traditional Pop Vocal Album at the 64th Annual Grammy Awards.

Background
Parton released "Comin' Home for Christmas" as a single in December 2009, but no mention of a Christmas album was made for almost seven years. Parton first mentioned that she was working on a new Christmas album during a Facebook Live Q&A in August 2016. She said that the album would be released in 2017 and would feature songs that she had written for the NBC TV movie Christmas of Many Colors: Circle of Love. The title song from the movie, "Circle of Love", was recorded by Jennifer Nettles, who played Parton's mother in the film, for her 2016 Christmas album, To Celebrate Christmas. The song was also recorded by Parton's niece Heidi Parton for her 2017 album, This Kind of Love. The album's release was delayed due to the release of Parton's first children's album, I Believe in You, in 2017 and the Dumplin' soundtrack album in 2018. The album's release was mentioned again in April 2020 by Parton's creative director Steve Summers, who mentioned in a YouTube livestream with Linda Perry that his team was working on preparations for the album photoshoot and that it would be coming out in 2020. Parton prematurely announced the album's title in addition to two song titles and a few of the guest artists during an interview with Eddie Stubbs on WSM in July 2020. Following the broadcast, the interview was posted to WSM's SoundCloud page, but was deleted by mid-afternoon the next day.

Release and promotion
The album was formally announced on August 12, 2020, and was made available for pre-order the following day. It was released October 2 on CD, digital download, and streaming. Target stores offered an exclusive version of the album featuring an alternate cover. An enhanced version of the album was made available for streaming on Spotify featuring exclusive video content. An Amazon Exclusive edition of the album featuring two bonus tracks was made available for streaming on October 6. The album was released November 13 on LP after its release was pushed back from October 2 due to a manufacturing delay. The LP version was released on opaque red, green, and gold vinyl on Parton's website. The LP was released on white vinyl exclusively on Amazon in the UK and peppermint colored vinyl by Magnolia Record Club. It was also released on cassette and 8-track on November 13, each featuring one bonus track, available exclusively through Amazon. A "Bonus Version" of the album was released for digital download and streaming on December 4 with one bonus track, a live recording of "I Still Believe", from the CBS TV special A Holly Dolly Christmas.

On August 26, 2022, Parton announced that the Ultimate Deluxe Edition of the album, updated to include an additional "eight tracks, including rarities making their CD, vinyl, and digital debuts", would be released on October 14, 2022.

Singles
"Comin Home for Christmas" was released as a stand alone single on December 1, 2009. It would be included on A Holly Dolly Christmas eleven years after its initial release and peaked at number 31 on the Billboard Holiday Digital Song Sales chart.

The album's first single, "Mary, Did You Know?", was previewed in an article on Good Housekeepings website on August 20 and was released to digital retailers the following day. It peaked at number 49 on the Billboard Hot Christian Songs chart and number 18 on the Billboard Christian Digital Song Sales chart.

"I Saw Mommy Kissing Santa Claus" was released as the second single on September 15.

The third single, "Christmas on the Square", was released on September 29 and peaked at number 49 on the Billboard Holiday Digital Song Sales chart.

"Cuddle Up, Cozy Down Christmas" was released as the fourth single on October 2 and peaked at number three on the Billboard Holiday Digital Song Sales chart, number 10 on the Billboard Adult Contemporary chart, number 6 on the Billboard Canada AC chart, and number 80 on the UK Singles Chart. An animated music video premiered November 6 on Parton's Facebook page and was released on YouTube the following day.

Parton surprise released "I Still Believe" from her CBS Christmas special as a digital bonus track and the album's fifth and final single on December 4. It peaked at number 22 on the Billboard Country Digital Song Sales chart and number 32 on the Billboard Holiday Digital Song Sales chart.

"A Smoky Mountain Christmas", from Parton's 1986 television movie of the same name, was released August 26, 2022, as the first single from the album's Ultimate Deluxe Edition . The second single, Parton's recording of "Silent Night" from the 1997 soundtrack album Annabelle's Wish, was released on September 23, 2022.

Other charted songs
Following the album's release several of its tracks charted on the Billboard Holiday Digital Song Sales chart. "All I Want for Christmas Is You" peaked at number four, "Circle of Love" peaked at number eight, "Pretty Paper" peaked at number 12, "Christmas Is" peaked at number 13, "Holly Jolly Christmas" peaked at number 16, "You Are My Christmas" peaked at number 21, and "Christmas Where We Are" peaked at number 34.

Animated music videos were released for "All I Want for Christmas Is You" and "Pretty Paper" on December 3 and December 22, respectively.

Television appearances
Parton performed "Circle of Love", "Comin' Home for Christmas", and "Mary, Did You Know?" during livestream event on Amazon Music titled Dolly Parton's Comin' Home for Christmas on November 13, followed by a Q&A hosted by Leslie Jordan.

Parton performed "Holly Jolly Christmas" from her studio in Nashville during a pre-recorded segment of the Macy's Thanksgiving Day Parade on November 26.

Parton and Jimmy Fallon performed "All I Want for Christmas Is You" in addition to Parton also performing "Mary, Did You Know?" during NBC's annual Christmas in Rockefeller Center tree-lighting ceremony on December 2. Both performances were pre-recorded at Parton’s studio in Nashville with Fallon’s portion being filmed in New York City on set of  The Tonight Show.

On December 4 Parton appeared on The Graham Norton Show where she performed "I Saw Mommy Kissing Santa Claus" via a pre-recorded performance from her studio in Nashville. Also on December 4, Parton hosted a livestream concert on Pandora with guests Brett Eldredge, Carly Pearce, and Tasha Cobbs Leonard. Parton performed "I Saw Mommy Kissing Santa Claus" and "Holly Jolly Christmas".

During the Toronto Santa Claus Parade on December 5, Parton performed "Holy Jolly Christmas" from her studio in Nashville during a pre-recorded segment.

CBS aired a television special titled A Holly Dolly Christmas starring Parton on December 6. Parton performed from an intimate, candlelit set while sharing personal Christmas stories and faith-based recollections of the season, interspersed with songs from the album. The special drew 6.2 million viewers and a 0.7 average rating among adults 18–49.

A pre-recorded video of Parton performing "Christmas Is" from her home aired during Cyndi Lauper's tenth annual Home for the Holidays fundraiser livestream on December 11 on TikTok and December 13 on YouTube.

Critical reception

A Holly Dolly Christmas received positive reviews from music critics. At Album of the Year, which assigns a normalized rating out of 100 to reviews from mainstream publications, the album received an average score of 76 based on 4 reviews. In a review for AllMusic, Timothy Monger gave the album four out of five stars, saying that the album "offers up a heartfelt, compassionate, and joyous cup of holiday cheer." He noted that unlike 1990's Home for Christmas, this album features Parton originals, "some of which are quite good." Matt Melis gave the album a B rating in a review for Consequence of Sound, saying "it feels like the kind of gift we could all stand to find under the tree." He named "Christmas Is", "Christmas on the Square", and "Pretty Paper" as the album's essential tracks.

Commercial performance
The album debuted and peaked at number 16 on the Billboard 200 chart with 27,000 equivalent album units of which 26,000 were pure album sales. It re-peaked at number 16 during its initial chart run. The album also debuted and peaked at number one on both the Billboard Top Country Albums chart and the Billboard Top Holiday Albums chart. In Europe the album peaked at number 11 on the Scottish Albums chart and number 16 on the UK Albums Chart.

As of December 2020, the album has sold 171,000 units in the United States, Parton's best since Backwoods Barbie.

Accolades
A Holly Dolly Christmas was nominated for Best Traditional Pop Vocal Album at the 64th Annual Grammy Awards.

Track listing

Personnel
Adapted from the album liner notes.

Performance
 Roy Agee – tenor trombone, bass trombone, orchestration
 David Angell – violin
 Monisa Angell – viola
 Michael Bublé – featured artist
 Wei Tsun Chang – violin
 Dennis Crouch – upright bass
 Billy Ray Cyrus – featured artist
 Miley Cyrus – featured artist
 Janet Darnell – violin
 David Davidson – violin, viola, orchestration
 Michael Davis – keys, B3, orchestration, percussion
 Richard Dennison – background vocals, piano
 Jimmy Fallon – featured artist
 Chris Farrell – viola
 Lloyd Green – steel guitar
 Vicki Hampton – background vocals
 Tom Hoey – drums, percussion
 Paul Hollowell – piano, B3
 Sam Levine – saxophone, flute, clarinet, orchestration
 Gary Lunn – bass, upright bass
 Steve Mackey – bass
 Aaron McCune –background vocals
 Jimmy Mattingly – fiddle, mandolin
 Paul Nelson – cello
 Willie Nelson – featured artist, acoustic guitar
 Jennifer O'Brien – background vocals
 Dolly Parton – lead vocals
 Heidi Parton – harmony vocals
 Randy Parton – featured artist
 Stefan Petreseu – violin
 Carole Rabinowitz – cello
 Sarighani Reist – cello
 Tom Rutledge – acoustic guitar
 Steve Turner – drums, percussion
 Mary Kathryn Vanosdale – violin
 Darrin Vincent – background vocals
 Rhonda Vincent – background vocals, mandolin
 Kent Wells – electric guitar, nylon string guitar, guitars, percussion, banjo, acoustic guitar, programming
 Karen Winkelmann – violin

Production
 Lakieta Bagwell-Garves – background vocal arrangement 
 Michael Bublé – vocal arrangement
 Steve Chadie – engineer
 Joey Crawford – engineer
 Cynthia Daniels – engineer
 David Davidson – orchestral arrangement
 Richard Dennison – vocal arrangements, producer
 Kyle Dickinson – editing
 Kat Elfman – production assistant
 Ryan Enockson – engineer
 Jamie Graves – vocal recording
 Paul David Hager – Miley vocal engineer
 Chris Latham – editing, vocal editing 
 Kam Luchterhand – assistant engineer
 Parker Lyons – assistant engineer
 Andrew Mayer - assistant engineer
 Joel McKenney – assistant engineer
 Patrick Murphy – tracking engineer, engineer
 Dolly Parton – executive producer
 Taylor Pollert – orchestra engineer
 Tom Rutledge – producer, engineer
 Cody Simpson – Miley vocal tracking engineer
 Tyler Spratt – editing
 Adam Wathan – assistant engineer
 Kent Wells – producer, overdubs
 Kevin Willis – engineer, editing, tracking engineer

Other personnel
 Hillary Adcock – seamstress
 Stacie Huckeba – photographer
 Tisha Lemming – master draper
 Vance Nichols – set design
 Kiley Reed – seamstress
 Cheryl Riddle – hair
 J.B. Rowland – art direction
 Rebecca Seaver – productions
 Steve Summers – costumer designer

Charts

Weekly charts

Year-end charts

Release history

References

2020 Christmas albums
Christmas albums by American artists
Country Christmas albums
Dolly Parton albums
Warner Music Group albums